Matteson is a surname. Notable people with the surname include:

Bob Matteson (born 1952), American soccer player
C. V. Matteson (1861–1931), American baseball player
Charles Matteson (1840–1925), Rhode Island Supreme Court Justice
Charles Matteson (1913–??), Canadian rower
Eddie Matteson (1884–1943), American baseball player
Joel Aldrich Matteson (1808–1873), American politician
John Matteson (born 1961), American writer and academic
Michael Matteson, Australian activist
Orsamus B. Matteson (1805–1889), American lawyer and politician
Rich Matteson (1929–1993), American jazz composer and educator
Silas Matteson, American politician
Steve Matteson (born 1965), American typographer
T. H. Matteson (1813–1884), American painter
Thomas T. Matteson (born 1935), Rear Admiral (United States)
Troy Matteson (born 1979), American golfer